Ramakrishna Vissamraju (20 August 1947 – 16 July 2015) was a playback singer in South India.

Personal life and career
Ramakrishna was born to Vissamraju Rangasayi and Ratnam on 20 August 1947. Ganakokila P.Suseela is his mother's sister.

He received a Bachelor of Science degree but decided to become a professional singer, a decision influenced by his admiration for Ghantasala. He sang light music for All India Radio.

Ramakrishna's debut movie song was "Vayase Oka Poolathota" in Vichitra Bandham in 1972. Throughout his career, he performed over 5000 songs in movies and devotional albums and has given numerous stage shows across Andhra Pradesh. He was a playback singer for Telugu actors such as NTR, ANR, Sobhan Babu, and Krishnam Raju. And also Krishna

Later in life, he took up acting and appeared in television series and films. He continued to give concerts across Andhra Pradesh.

In 1976, he married Jyothi Khanna, who was also a singer. The couple had two children, Lekha, and Sai Kiran, who made his acting début in Nuvve Kaavali in 2001.

Another famous singer S. P. Balasubrahmanyam also sang a song that had been chosen earlier for Ramakrishna, and he even sang a song sung earlier by Rama Krishna. Apart from all these, he is a true altruist and took every thing for good and good inspiration for others.

Filmography

Death
He died on 16 July 2015, having suffered from cancer for ten months and having been admitted to Banjara Hills Omega Hospitals. He was 67 and is survived by his wife, son Sai Kiran and daughter Lekha.

References

External links

 P. Ramakrishna at Cinegoer.com

1947 births
2015 deaths
Telugu playback singers
20th-century Indian singers
All India Radio people
Indian male playback singers
20th-century Indian male singers